Trainline (formerly Thetrainline.com) is an international digital rail and coach technology platform with headquarters in London. It sells train tickets and railcards as well as providing free access to live train times and railway station information through its website and mobile app which is available on the iOS and Android platforms. Listed on the London Stock Exchange, it is a constituent of the FTSE 250 Index.

History

Trainline was established in 1997 by the Virgin Group, and online ticket sales began in 1999. It was operated under contract by Capgemini. Stagecoach later purchased a 49% shareholding. In February 2004 Trainline merged with Qjump, its main competitor. Stagecoach sold out, with Virgin having an 86% shareholding in the merged company with National Express owning the other 14%.

In July 2006, Exponent Private Equity acquired Trainline. In July 2007, Trainline acquired Advanced Smartcard Technologies and ECEBS, signalling a new strategy to enter the smartcard market. Ecebs was subsequently sold to Bell ID in November 2012.

The company was bought from Exponent by KKR in January 2015. In August 2015, the company announced it had changed its name from thetrainline.com to Trainline. In 2016, it acquired Captain Train and re-branded it as Trainline EU.

In June 2019, after an initial public offering the company floated on the London Stock Exchange. At the end of February 2021, Clare Gilmartin stepped down as CEO and was replaced by Jody Ford who had joined the business in July 2020.

Activities
In addition to the online service provided direct to customers operated under its own brands Trainline and Qjump, it provides the website services for some of the UK train operating companies, as well as providing a rail business travel service direct to a number of large blue chip corporations, travel management companies and travel agents. Trainline also provides a call centre service to a number of the customers referred to above.

References

External links
 
 Trainline on Facebook
 Trainline on Twitter

Companies listed on the London Stock Exchange
Fare collection systems in the United Kingdom
Kohlberg Kravis Roberts companies
National Express companies
Route planning software
Stagecoach Group
Transport companies established in 1997
International rail transport retailers
Virgin Group
1997 establishments in England
2019 initial public offerings